Les Sœurs Soleil is a 1997 French comedy film directed by Jeannot Szwarc, starring and co-written by Marie-Anne Chazel.

Cast
 Marie-Anne Chazel as Bénédicte D'Hachicourt
 Clémentine Célarié as Gloria Soleil / Françoise Tricot
 Thierry Lhermitte as Brice D'Hachicourt
 Bernard Farcy as Norbert
 Christian Clavier A Spectator
 Samir Guesmi as The arab
 Adrian Lester as Isaac Nelson
 Annie Grégorio

Production
The movie was filmed in London, England and Paris, France.

Reception
The film opened on 330 screens in France and grossed $813,804 placing fifth at the French box office.

References

External links

1997 films
1997 comedy films
Films directed by Jeannot Szwarc
French comedy films
1990s French films